Mostovaya is a rural locality (a village) in Sylvenskoye Rural Settlement, Permsky District, Perm Krai, Russia. The population was 49 as of 2010. There are 35 streets.

Geography 
Mostovaya is located 44 km southeast of Perm (the district's administrative centre) by road. Nazarovo is the nearest rural locality.

References 

Rural localities in Permsky District